660 Crescentia is a minor planet orbiting the Sun that was discovered by American astronomer Joel Hastings Metcalf on January 8, 1908.
The name may have been inspired by the asteroid's provisional designation 1908 CC.  Peter Ting points out that the Rev. Joel Metcalf of Taunton (Massachusetts) discovered six asteroids with unexplained names, though listed in Lutz Schmadel's book.  Ting used an on-line planetarium website to help with the location of some of the planets, playing back to the night of discovery.  He noticed that there was a crescent moon (33%) low in the western sky and wonders if the Rev. Metcalf could have named the asteroid for the moon. Crescentia would be a very unusual name for a person but not for a phase of the moon. 

Crescentia is a member of the dynamic Maria family of asteroids that most likely formed as the result of a collisional breakup of a parent body.

References

External links 
 Lightcurve plot of 660 Crescentia, Palmer Divide Observatory, B. D. Warner (2009)
 Asteroid Lightcurve Database (LCDB), query form (info )
 Dictionary of Minor Planet Names, Google books
 Asteroids and comets rotation curves, CdR – Observatoire de Genève, Raoul Behrend
 Discovery Circumstances: Numbered Minor Planets (1)-(5000) – Minor Planet Center
 
 

Maria asteroids
Crescentia
Crescentia
S-type asteroids (Tholen)
19080108